WPBP-LP (104.5 FM, "The Pirate") is a low-power FM radio station licensed to serve the community of Pearl, Mississippi, United States, and serving the Jackson, Mississippi metropolitan area. The station airs a hot adult contemporary format along with live broadcasts of Pearl High School football, basketball and baseball games. It is owned by the City of Pearl, Mississippi as part of the city's Pearl Municipal Broadcasting department, along with PMBtv, its television station.

External links
 

PBP-LP
PBP-LP
Hot adult contemporary radio stations in the United States